The Industrial Areas Foundation (IAF) is a national community organizing network established in 1940 by Saul Alinsky, Roman Catholic Bishop Bernard James Sheil and businessman and founder of the Chicago Sun-Times Marshall Field III.  The IAF partners with religious congregations and civic organizations at the local level to help them build organizations of organizations, referred to as broad-based organizations by the Industrial Areas Foundation, with the purpose of strengthening citizen leadership, developing trust across a community's dividing lines and taking action on issues identified by local community leaders.

The Industrial Areas Foundation consists of 65 affiliates in the US, Canada, the United Kingdom, Germany and Australia, with the US projects organized into two regions, West / Southwest IAF and Metro IAF. IAF provides training, consultation and organizers for its affiliated organizations.

The Industrial Areas Foundation does not provide direct services, but through its organizing has created notable entities for workforce development (Project QUEST, Capital IDEA, Project IOWA, VIDA, ARRIBA, NOVA, Skills Quest, Capital IDEA - Houston, AZ Career Pathways and JobPath), healthcare (Common Ground Healthcare), and housing development for working- and middle-class families (Nehemiah Project in East Brooklyn and The Road Home Program in New Orleans).  In 1994, the IAF organization in Baltimore designed and passed the first living wage bill in the US, and since then IAF organizations across the country have won changes including municipal living wage policies for public sector workers and living wage requirements for tax abatements or economic incentives, that have raised the wages of millions of workers.

History

Under Alinsky
Alinsky's first organizing project was organizing the Back of the Yards Neighborhood Council, founded in 1939 as the Packinghouse Workers, the union of Chicago's meatpacking industry. Based on his work with Back of the Yards, Alinsky laid out his vision for "People's Organizations" in his book Reveille for Radicals, in 1946. After World War II, Alinsky met Fred Ross in California, and in 1949 he agreed to back his plan to organize the Community Service Organization in Mexican-American communities.

Ross introduced house meetings as an organizing technique and built a network of 30 CSOs in California with energetic young organizers Cesar Chávez and Dolores Huerta.

In Chicago, Alinsky developed a team of organizers including journalist Nicholas von Hoffman, ex-seminarian Edward T. Chambers, and Tom Gaudette, who developed such groups as the Organization for the Southwest Community (1959–1972), The Woodlawn Organization (1961–present), and the Northwest Community Organization (1962–present).

The Woodlawn Organization (TWO) received national attention through Charles Silberman's best-selling Crisis in Black and White in 1964, which traced the roots of oppression and violence in northern inner-city areas. In his concluding chapter, "The Revolt Against Welfare Colonialism," Silberman portrayed TWO as an example of poor blacks reclaiming their dignity through self-organization and creating their own jobs, instead of blaming whites for all their problems.

Alinsky's experience in Rochester, New York from 1965 to 1969 with the organization FIGHT and its battle with Eastman Kodak was more controversial and less successful.

In 1969, Alinsky was able to establish a formal IAF organizer training program, run by Chambers and Dick Harmon, with a grant from Gordon Sherman of Midas Muffler. Alinsky published a successful book, Rules for Radicals, in 1971, updating his earlier vision.

Alinsky died unexpectedly of a heart attack in June 1972.

After Alinsky

After Alinsky's death, his long-time associate and designated successor Ed Chambers, became executive director.  Chambers began to place systematic training of organizers and local leaders at the center of IAF's work. He also began to shift the organizing model of "the modern IAF" toward the congregation-based community organization developed in San Antonio, Texas by Ernesto Cortes Jr., called Communities Organized for Public Service (COPS).  Cortes recruited lay leaders, including many women, from the Catholic parishes that were members of COPS.  Relational meetings or "one-on-ones" became an important technique of exploring values, motivation, and self-interest of potential leaders.  Chambers and Cortes emphasized a long-term relationship between IAF and such groups as COPS, in contrast to the "three years and out" that Alinsky had once imagined.  As IAF began to expand to other cities in Texas, it moved to develop multi-racial, broad-based organizations spanning metropolitan areas, and including African American, Latino, and Anglo churches.  Eventually its network of local groups in Texas linked together as Texas Interfaith to influence state government.  In 1979 Chambers moved the IAF headquarters to New York after the Archdiocese of Chicago cut its support for IAF.  In 1996 IAF moved its national headquarters back to Chicago to develop a new affiliate in that metropolitan area and expand its work in the South, Southwest and Midwest.

IAF developed successful projects along the East Coast with East Brooklyn Congregations, which pioneered the affordable housing project called Nehemiah Homes, and BUILD in Baltimore which also developed Nehemiah housing for low-income people.

The "modern IAF" has been an influential model for other networks of broad-based community organizations, including PICO National Network, Gamaliel Foundation, and Direct Action and Research Training Center (DART).

IAF claims responsibility for the success of the first living wage law in Baltimore in 1994, followed by New York City in 1996, Tucson in 1998, the Rio Grande Valley in the late 1990s and early 2000s and, most recently, in Austin, Texas.

Governance

IAF's legal authority rests in a Board of Trustees, which functions more as an advisory body, recently including such notables as Jean Bethke Elshtain and the late Monsignor John Joseph Egan. IAF's first Board of Trustees included Catholic bishop Bernard James Sheil, Kathryn Lewis (daughter of coal miners union leader John L. Lewis), and philanthropist Marshall Field III.  Chambers retired as executive director in 2009, but remains on the board of directors.  The senior regional organizers, including Cortes, Arnold Graf, Michael Gecan, and Sr. Christine Stephens, for a time acted as a team of co-directors.  Recently IAF has divided itself administratively into two parts: West/Southwest IAF (Cortes and Stephens) and Metro IAF in the East and Midwest (Graf and Gecan).

Training

The national IAF conducts an intensive eight-day leadership training program annually, alternating the venue between Chicago and Los Angeles, and also has a 90-day organizer internship program.  IAF's "iron rule of organizing" ("Never do for others what they can do for themselves") emphasizes developing new leaders from within local organizations.

Affiliates

IAF affiliates with web pages are listed below.

East
  Greater Boston Interfaith Organization (GBIO) – Boston, Massachusetts
  Interfaith Community Organization (ICO) – Hoboken, New Jersey
  Washington Interfaith Network (WIN) – Washington, DC
  Action in Montgomery (AIM) – Silver Spring, Maryland
  Baltimoreans United for Leadership Development (BUILD) – Baltimore, Maryland
  People Acting Together in Howard (PATH) – Columbia, Maryland
  Virginians Organized for Interfaith Community Engagement (VOICE) – Northern Virginia
  Metro IAF NY – New York
 East Brooklyn Congregations (EBC)
 Manhattan Together
 EQUAL - Empowered Queens United in Action and Leadership (EQUAL)
 South Bronx Churches
 LI-CAN - Long Island Congregations, Associations and Neighborhoods
 Westchester United

South
  Durham Congregations, Associations, and Neighborhoods (Durham CAN) – Durham, North Carolina
 Communities Helping All Neighbors Gain Empowerment (CHANGE) – Winston-Salem, North Carolina
  Orange County Justice United in Community Effort (Orange JUICE or JUSTICE UNITED) – Chapel Hill, North Carolina
 Working Together Jackson in Jackson, Mississippi

Midwest
 Greater Cleveland Congregations (GCC) – Cleveland, OH
  DuPage United – Glen Ellyn, Illinois
  Lake County United – Libertyville, Illinois
  United Power for Action and Justice – Chicago, Illinois
  Omaha Together One Community (OTOC) – Omaha, Nebraska
  Dane County United – Madison, Wisconsin
  Southeastern Wisconsin Common Ground – Milwaukee, Wisconsin
  A Mid-Iowa Organizing Strategy (AMOS) – Des Moines, Iowa
 Voices Organized In Civic Engagement (VOICE-OKC) in Oklahoma City, OK

Southwest
  The Jeremiah Group – New Orleans, Louisiana
 Together Baton Rouge in Baton Rouge, Louisiana
  Albuquerque Interfaith – Albuquerque, New Mexico
 Dallas Area Interfaith (DAI) – Dallas, Texas
  Allied Communities of Tarrant (ACT) – Fort Worth, Texas
  The Metropolitan Organization (TMO) – Houston, Texas
  Arizona Interfaith Organization – Phoenix, Arizona
  Austin Interfaith – Austin, Texas
 Border Interfaith – El Paso, Texas
 COPS/Metro Alliance in San Antonio, Texas
 Nevadans for the Common Good in Las Vegas Valley, Nevada
 Northern Arizona Interfaith Council in Flagstaff, Arizona
 Pima County Interfaith Council in Pima County, Arizona 
 Valley Interfaith Project in Phoenix, Arizona

West
  One LA – IAF – Los Angeles, California
 Bay Area Industrial Areas Foundation – San Francisco Bay Area
 Communities Organized for Relational Power in Action – Central California
 Inland Empire Sponsoring Committee Pomona, CA & Inland Empire

Northwest
  Metropolitan Alliance for the Common Good (MACG) – Portland, Oregon
  Sound Alliance – Tukwila, Washington
  Spokane Alliance – Spokane, Washington

International
  Greater Edmonton Alliance – Edmonton, Alberta, Canada
  Calgary Alliance for the Common Good – Calgary, Alberta, Canada
 Metro Vancouver Alliance – Vancouver, British Columbia, Canada
  Greater Victoria Acting Together – Victoria, British Columbia, Canada
  Citizen Organizing Foundation (COF) – London, England, United Kingdom
 Sydney Alliance – Sydney, New South Wales, Australia
 Queensland Community Alliance – South East Queensland, Australia
 Deutsches Institut für Community Organizing Germany

Notes

References
Alinsky, Saul, Reveille for Radicals (Chicago: University of Chicago Press, 1946).
Alinsky, Saul, Rules for Radicals (New York: Vintage Books, 1971).  
Chambers, Edward T. and Michael A. Cowan, Roots for Radicals: Organizing for Power, Action, and Justice (New York: Continuum, 2003).  
Gecan, Michael, Going Public: An Organizer's Guide to Citizen Action (New York: Anchor Books, 2002).  
Greider, William, Who Will Tell the People? (Simon & Schuster/Touchstone, 1992).  
Horwitt, Sanford D., Let Them Call Me Rebel: Saul Alinsky- His Life and Legacy (New York: Alfred A. Knopf, 1989).  
Industrial Areas Foundation, IAF: 50 Years Organizing for Change (Franklin Square, NY: Industrial Areas Foundation, 1990).
Osterman, Paul, Gathering Power (Boston, MA: Beacon Press) 2002. 
Penta, Leo (Hrsg.), Community Organizing - Menschen verändern ihre Stadt (Hamburg: edition Körber-Stiftung, 2007). 
Rogers, Mary Beth, Cold Anger: A Story of Faith and Power Politics (Denton: University of North Texas Press, 1990).  
Sanders, Marion K., The Professional Radical: Conversations with Saul Alinsky (New York: Harper & Row, 1970).
Stout, Jeffrey, Blessed Are the Organized (Princeton University Press, 2010).
Walls, David, Community Organizing: Fanning the Flame of Democracy  (Polity Press, 2015).  
Warren, Mark R., Dry Bones Rattling: Community Building to Revitalize American Democracy (Princeton University Press, 2001).  
Wilson, William Julius, Bridge Over the Racial Divide (University of California Press, 2001).

External links

West/Southwest IAF homepage
Metro-IAF homepage

Non-profit organizations based in Chicago
Community organizations
Nonpartisan organizations in the United States
Organizations established in 1940
1940 establishments in Illinois